Hannington Bridge is a road bridge across the River Thames in England. It carries a minor road between Kempsford in Gloucestershire and Hannington Wick in Wiltshire. It was built of stone in 1841, replacing an earlier wooden bridge.

The bridge comprises three small skew arches, with a causeway at either end with flood arches. The river is navigable to it for rowing boats from downstream Lechlade but the bridge is difficult for boats to negotiate as the river is fast and shallow.

See also
Crossings of the River Thames

References

Bridges across the River Thames
Skew bridges